In organic chemistry, two molecules are valence isomers when they are constitutional isomers that can interconvert through pericyclic reactions.

Benzene
There are many valence isomers one can draw for the C6H6 formula benzene. Some were originally proposed for benzene itself before the actual structure of benzene was known. Others were later synthesized in lab. Some have been observed to isomerize to benzene, whereas others tend to undergo other reactions instead, or isomerize by ways other than pericyclic reactions.

Cyclooctatetraene
The valence isomers are not restricted to isomers of benzene. Valence isomers are also seen in the series (CH)8. Due to the larger number of units, the number of possible valence isomers is also greater and at least 21:

Naphthalene and azulene
Perhaps no pair of valence isomers differ more strongly in appearance than colourless naphthalene and the intensely violet azulene.

Benzene oxide and oxepin

References

External links

Isomerism